Blythe Township is one of twenty current townships in Boone County, Arkansas, USA. As of the 2010 census, its total population was 245.

Geography

Population history
In 1910, the township included the area of the incorporated town of Zinc.  That area is now part of Zinc Township.

References
 United States Census Bureau 2008 TIGER/Line Shapefiles
 United States Board on Geographic Names (GNIS)
 United States National Atlas

 Census 2010 U.S. Gazetteer Files: County Subdivisions in Arkansas

External links
 US-Counties.com
 City-Data.com

Townships in Boone County, Arkansas
Townships in Arkansas